Eugeniu Rebenja (born 5 March 1995) is a Moldovan footballer who plays as a forward for Croatian side Zrinski Jurjevac.

Honours
 Sheriff Tiraspol:
Divizia Națională: 2015–16''', 2016–17

References

External links

1995 births
Living people
People from Tiraspol
Association football forwards
Moldovan footballers
Moldova youth international footballers
Moldova under-21 international footballers
FC Sheriff Tiraspol players
FC Tiraspol players
Speranța Nisporeni players
FC Dinamo-Auto Tiraspol players
CS Petrocub Hîncești players
FC Florești players
Floriana F.C. players
Moldovan Super Liga players
Maltese Premier League players
Second Football League (Croatia) players
Moldovan expatriate footballers
Expatriate footballers in Malta
Moldovan expatriate sportspeople in Malta
Expatriate footballers in Croatia
Moldovan expatriate sportspeople in Croatia